An unofficial referendum on the European Convention on Human Rights was held in the Pitcairn Islands on 18 July 2007. Voters were given the option to adopt the European Convention on Human Rights (ECHR), the islands' own Human Rights Charter, a combination of the two or neither of them. A majority voted to adopt the ECHR alone.

Results

See also
Territorial scope of European Convention on Human Rights

References

Referendums in the Pitcairn Islands
Pitcairn
2007 in the Pitcairn Islands
July 2007 events in Oceania
European Convention on Human Rights